Mossend EuroTerminal is a freight-handling station in Mossend. It is situated across the line from the Mossend Railhead.

History 
In 1991, the site was selected by British Rail for the only Scottish facility for handling freight arriving in Great Britain from the Channel Tunnel. It was constructed on mostly greenfield land. It opened in 1994. However, demand for international rail freight failed to meet expectations.

In August 2021, it was announced that the site would be leased to Maritime Intermodal from 1 October 2021.

Operation 
The facility is operated by DB Schenker. It is used for the transfer of freight from rail to road and vice versa, for swapping freight between electric and diesel locomotives, and as a stopping point for crew changes.

References 

Bellshill
Transport in North Lanarkshire
Rail transport in Scotland
Rail yards in the United Kingdom
Channel Tunnel
DB Cargo UK